Psalis is a genus of tussock moths in the family Erebidae. The genus was erected by Jacob Hübner in 1823.

Species
The following species are included in the genus.
Psalis africana Kiriakoff, 1956
Psalis antica Walker, 1855
Psalis approximata Walker, 1865
Psalis costalis Matsumura, 1911
Psalis falcata Walker, 1865
Psalis kanshireiensis Wileman, & South 1917
Psalis pennatula Fabricius, 1793
Psalis praeusta Felder, 1874
Psalis punctuligera Mabille, 1880
Psalis securis Hübner, 1823
Psalis tacta Walker, 1865

References

Lymantriinae
Noctuoidea genera